The Denali Commission is a federal agency in the US based in Anchorage, Alaska that provides critical utilities, infrastructure, and economic support throughout Alaska.

History
It was established in 1998 by the Denali Commission Act of 1998 which was part of an omnibus appropriations bill. Since 2015, it has been assisting Alaskan communities whose existence is threatened by rising sea levels caused by climate change.

As of 2019, it has a budget of over $46 million.

Governance
Modeled on the Appalachian Regional Commission, the Denali Commission is led by a Federal Co-Chair. Unlike similar commissions, the Federal Co-Chair for the Denali Commission is appointed by the Secretary of Commerce rather than by the President with the advice and consent of the Senate. As a single state commission, its state co-chair is the Governor of Alaska. The remaining membership consists of the University of Alaska president; the Alaska Municipal League president; the Alaska Federation of Natives president; the Alaska State AFL-CIO president; and the Associated General Contractors of Alaska president.

See also
 Appalachian Regional Commission, a similar federal-state partnership in Appalachia
 Delta Regional Authority, a similar federal-state partnership in the Mississippi Delta region
 List of micro-regional organizations
 Northern Border Regional Commission, a similar federal-state partnership consisting of areas of Maine, New Hampshire, New York, and Vermont along the Canada–United States border.
 Southeast Crescent Regional Commission
 Tennessee Valley Authority

References

External links
 

Agencies of the United States government
Government agencies established in 1998
1998 establishments in the United States
Economic development organizations in the United States
Rural development in the United States
United States federal boards, commissions, and committees